Brickell House is a condominium tower in the Brickell neighborhood of Miami, Florida. It was built by Newgard Development Group. Construction began in spring of 2012, making it one of the first condominium projects to go ahead in Miami since the 2007 housing bust and late 2000s recession. Construction of the tower was estimated to create 300 to 400 jobs.

The financing model, popular in Latin America, is for the $170 million project is for at least 70% of the units are presold before construction begins, which ensures financing and reduces the likelihood of foreclosure. The tower is located in Miami's Brickell Financial District at 1330 Brickell Bay Drive. It features 374 units and a robotic parking garage. Units ranged from  studios to  3-bedroom units, as well as  penthouses. The ground level features retail and restaurant space.  The architect is Sieger Suarez and the interior designer is Yabu Pushelberg.  Brickell House is located one block east of the Financial District Metromover station and three blocks southeast of the Brickell Metrorail and Metromover transfer station.

In 2015, management and design issues led to a closure of the robotic parking garage, which had already been operating slower than expected

See also
 List of tallest buildings in Miami

References

External links
 
 Brickell House at Emporis
 Brickell House construction info
 
 Brickell House in Miami

Residential skyscrapers in Miami
Residential buildings completed in 2014
Residential condominiums in Miami
2014 establishments in Florida